The British Schools Chess Championship is an annual competition for school chess teams that has been in existence continuously from 1958. The tournament is administered by the English Chess Federation and is open to all schools from the United Kingdom. The competition has been won by teams from all four countries of the UK.

Eligibility

Entry is open to any school in England, Scotland, Wales and Northern Ireland. All players must be under-19 on 31 August of the year in which the competition begins. Teams are made up of six players.

Sponsorship

In 1938 The Sunday Times (UK) made an offer to the then British Chess Federation to donate a trophy for a competition between teams from Public schools. Before further investigation of this offer could be completed the war intervened. Finally in 1957-58 competition got under way under the sponsorship of The Sunday Times (UK) newspaper. Their patronage continued until 1983, when their sister paper The Times took over. Since the withdrawal of sponsorship by The Times after the 2001 finals, the championship continued without a sponsor until 2008.

At the height of popularity in the 1970s, in excess of 1000 teams took part, but since then a decline in the number of teams has taken place. In 2007-08, the accepted entry increased from 93 teams to 135 teams, which represented the highest number of entries for four years. Yateley Manor School, from Yateley in Hampshire, sponsors from 2008-2011, supported the event through a difficult period and deserve special mention.

The competition, now known as the National Schools Chess Championships, was relaunched by the English Chess Federation in 2012 with sponsorship from St Catherine's School, Bramley to support a tournament for girls, with both U11 and U19 sections, Heathside Preparatory School, from Hampstead, London for a new U11 open section and Winchester College for the U19 open section.

National finalists

1950s

1960s

1970s

1980s

1990s

2000s

2010-2015

2016 onwards
From the 2016 final onwards 16 schools played at the final, with the plate trophy going to the best result by a first round loser.

Plate

1990s

2000s

2010s

Until 2015 there was an age handicap system in operation based on the average age of each team.

Teams initially compete in regional zones with the winner of each zone progressing to the National stage of the competition.  There were four occasions where Primary Schools won their Regional finals against older teams.  Two of these occasions were by St Teresa's RC Primary School, Colchester.

Sources

 The Times
 The Sunday Times (UK)
 Southern Counties Chess Union Website

External links
Official updates from Competition Controller
English Chess Federation
National Schools Chess Championship

Chess competitions
Chess in the United Kingdom
1958 establishments in the United Kingdom
Recurring events established in 1958
School sport in the United Kingdom
Annual events in the United Kingdom
Competitions in the United Kingdom